Blue River virus (BRV) is a single-stranded, negative sense RNA virus of New World hantavirus isolated from a white-footed mouse (Peromyscus leucopus) near the Blue River in Jackson County, Missouri in 1995. Its genome is similar to Sin Nombre orthohantavirus (SNV) but varies in the S1 and S2 segments. Like Sin Nombre orthohantavirus, Blue River virus causes Hantavirus pulmonary syndrome (HPS) in humans.

Natural reservoir 
As with all hantavirus species and their reservoirs, Blue River virus is unique to the white-footed mouse.

Transmission 
As has been shown with other hantaviruses, transmission is through droplet respiration when rodent excreta becomes aerosolized. Blue River virus has not been shown to transfer via person-to-person.

See also 
 1993 Four Corners hantavirus outbreak

References

External links 
 "Hantaviruses, with emphasis on Four Corners Hantavirus" by Brian Hjelle, M.D., Department of Pathology, School of Medicine, University of New Mexico
 CDC's Hantavirus Technical Information Index page
 Viralzone: Hantavirus
 Virus Pathogen Database and Analysis Resource (ViPR): Hantaviridae
 Occurrences and deaths in North and South America
 Blue River virus genome

Hantaviridae
Zoonoses
Infraspecific virus taxa